Othneil Bailey (born 8 February 1988) is a Vincentian squash player. He has represented Saint Vincent and the Grenadines at the Commonwealth Games in 2014 and 2018.

References

1988 births
Living people
Saint Vincent and the Grenadines male squash players
Squash players at the 2014 Commonwealth Games
Squash players at the 2018 Commonwealth Games
Commonwealth Games competitors for Saint Vincent and the Grenadines